Shehni (Persian: شهنی) is a Bakhtiari clan that consists of multiple sub-clans. The Shehni clan is itself a part of the Haft Lang branch of the Bakhtiari tribe in Iran.

List of Shehni sub-clans: 
 Belel
 Bahadorvand
 Tajdinvand
 Shahsevand
 Khaje
 Sheykh
 Sheykhvand
 Barvand
 Charm
 Arzanivand
 Kashani
 Ghanbarvand

References
Bakhtiari History by Sardar Assad Bakhtiari (Persian: تاریخ بختیاری نوشته سردار اسعد بختیاری)

Ethnic groups in Iran
Nomadic groups in Iran